Ki-ha is a Korean masculine given name. Its meaning differs based on the hanja used to write each syllable of the name. There are 68 hanja with the reading "ki" and 24 hanja with the reading "ha" on the South Korean government's official list of hanja which may be registered for use in given names.

Rhee Ki-ha (born 1938), South Korean taekwondo master
Jang Ki-ha (born 1982), South Korean singer
Shin Ki-ha (1941–1997), South Korean politician

See also
List of Korean given names

References

Korean masculine given names